Bruno Giacconi (20 November 1889 – 25 February 1957) was an Italian sports shooter. He competed in the 25 m pistol event at the 1936 Summer Olympics.

References

External links
 

1889 births
1957 deaths
Italian male sport shooters
Olympic shooters of Italy
Shooters at the 1936 Summer Olympics
Sportspeople from the Province of Ancona